Juan de Urteaga, O.S.H. (died 1540) was a Roman Catholic prelate who was appointed the first Bishop of Chiapas (1539–1540).

Biography
Juan de Urteaga was ordained a priest in the Order of Saint Jerome. On 30 Mar 1539, he was appointed during the papacy of Pope Paul III as Bishop of Chiapas. He died before he was consecrated bishop in 1540.

References

External links and additional sources
 (for Chronology of Bishops) 
 (for Chronology of Bishops)  

16th-century Roman Catholic bishops in Mexico
Bishops appointed by Pope Paul III
1540 deaths
Hieronymite bishops